Miloslavsky (masculine), Miloslavskaya (feminine), or Miloslavskoye (neuter) is the name of several inhabited localities in Russia.

Urban localities
Miloslavskoye, Ryazan Oblast, a work settlement in Miloslavsky District of Ryazan Oblast

Rural localities
Miloslavskoye, Novgorod Oblast, a village in Rakomskoye Settlement of Novgorodsky District of Novgorod Oblast
Miloslavskoye, Tver Oblast, a village in Pestrikovskoye Rural Settlement of Kashinsky District of Tver Oblast
Miloslavskaya, Arkhangelsk Oblast, a village in Shangalsky Selsoviet of Ustyansky District of Arkhangelsk Oblast
Miloslavskaya, Vologda Oblast, a village in Pokrovsky Selsoviet of Velikoustyugsky District of Vologda Oblast